Damián Martínez (footballer, born 1990) may refer to:

 Damián Martínez (footballer, born January 1990), Argentine defender for Unión Santa Fe
 Damián Martínez (footballer, born June 1990), Argentine forward for CRIBA